The 11077 / 11078 Jhelum Express is a daily train on the Indian Railways. It runs from Pune, the cultural capital of Maharashtra, to Jammu Tawi, the winter capital of Jammu and Kashmir, in North India.

The train is strategically important, as it connects the headquarters of the Southern Command of the Indian Army, Pune, with an important border city. And Military Reserved compartment.

History

The Jhelum Express is one of the oldest trains originating from Pune. Started in 1979, it was the first train connecting Pune to the capital city of New Delhi. The train was initially started for the military.

Number and nomenclature
Although it is River Tawi, a tributary of River Chenab which flows through the city of Jammu, the train is named after the Jhelum, often confused with the river is also a city on the banks of the river it's named after. This nomenclature was adopted at the behest of S. Prakash Singh Ghai, a partner at 'Ghai Brothers', a pioneer firm of railway contractors around the time the train first hit the tracks. The Ghai family hailed from the Pinanwal, a village in district Jhelum and settled in Pune post-partition. The Up train, Pune–Jammu Tawi, has the number 11077, while the Down train, Jammu Tawi–Pune, is numbered 11078.

Route & Halts

Future prospects
With the doubling and electrification of the Daund–Manmad section and the Jalandhar–Pathankot–Jammu Tawi section, the Jhelum Express is expected to run faster, with comparatively less running time. Moreover, with the completion of Katra–Banihal section in 2018 December, the train is also expected to be extended to Srinagar, linking the important army setups in Kashmir with Northern Command headquarters in Udhampur and Southern Command headquarters in Pune.

Traction

Initially it was hauled by Pune-based twin WDM-3A or a single WDP-4 from Pune Junction till  after which it was hauled by a Bhusawal-based WAP-4 or Ghaziabad-based WAP-7 or WAP-4 until Jalandhar after which it was hauled by a Ludhiana-based WDM-3A till Jammu Tawi.

With the electrification of the Jalandhar–Pathankot-Jammu Tawi section in 2014 and Pune–Daund-Manmad section in 2016, it is hauled from end-to-end by a Ghaziabad- based WAP-7 locomotive.

Gallery

See also

 Shalimar Express
 Malwa Express
 Goa Express

References

External links
 

Named passenger trains of India
Rail transport in Maharashtra
Transport in Jammu
Transport in Pune
Rail transport in Jammu and Kashmir
Express trains in India